Yes We Have No Mañanas (So Get Your Mañanas Today) is the seventh studio album by Kevin Ayers, released in June 1976. This LP marked Kevin Ayers' return to the leftfield Harvest label. Producer Muff Winwood employed a straightforward pop production that clipped some of Ayers' usual eccentricities from the tapes.

The band comprised Rob Townsend from Family on drums, Taste's Charlie McCracken on bass, B.J. Cole's steel guitar and Ollie Halsall's guitar.

Track listing
All tracks written by Kevin Ayers except where noted.

Personnel

Musicians
 Kevin Ayers – guitar, vocals
 Billy Livsey –  keyboards
 Charlie McCracken – bass
 Ollie Halsall – lead guitar
 Rob Townsend – drums, percussion
 Roger Saunders – rhythm guitar

Additional musicians
 B.J. Cole – steel guitar (tracks 3, 5)
 Rick Wills – bass (track 6)
 Zoot Money – keyboards (track 6)
 Tony Newman – drums (track 6)
 Andy Roberts – guitar (track 8)
 Mickey Feat – bass (track 8)
 Nick Rowley – keyboards (track 8)
 Roger Pope – drums (track 8)
 Pip Williams – arranger (track 5)
 David Bedford – choral arranger (track 10)

Technical
 Muff Winwood – producer
 Mike Robinson – engineer
 Peter Mew – mastering
 Peter Shepherd – design
 Peter Vernon – photography
 Mark Powell – liner notes

References & Sources
NME - Album review (June 1976)
Original LP sleevenotes

1976 albums
Kevin Ayers albums
Harvest Records albums
Albums produced by Muff Winwood